The men's 200 metre freestyle S14 event at the 2014 Commonwealth Games as part of the swimming programme took place on 26 July at the Tollcross International Swimming Centre in Glasgow, Scotland.

The medals were presented by Jon Amos, Chairman of the International Paralympic Committee Powerlifting Sport Technical Committee and the quaichs were presented by Nigel Chamier, Chairman of the Gold Coast 2018 Commonwealth Games Corporation.

Records
Prior to this competition, the existing world and Commonwealth Games records were as follows.

The following records were established during the competition:

Results

Heats

Finals

References

Men's 200 metre freestyle S14
Commonwealth Games